Tyumentsevsky District is an administrative and municipal district (raion), one of the fifty-nine in Altai Krai, Russia. Its administrative center is the rural locality (a selo) of Tyumentsevo. Population:  The population of Tyumentsevo accounts for 35.5% of the district's total population.

Geography
The district is located in the north of the krai, in the area of the Ob Plateau.

References

Notes

Sources

Districts of Altai Krai